This is the electoral history of Bill de Blasio, the 109th Mayor of New York City since 2014. Previously, he represented the 39th district in Brooklyn in the New York City Council from 2002 to 2009 and served as the 3rd Public Advocate of New York City from 2010 to 2013. He briefly ran for the Democratic presidential nomination in the 2020 United States presidential election.

New York City Council elections

2001

2003

2005

New York City Public Advocate elections

2009

As no Democratic candidate reached 40%, a runoff election between the leading two candidates (de Blasio and Green) was required.

New York City Mayoral elections

2013

2017

References 

Bill de Blasio
de Blasio, Bill
de Blasio, Bill